Giuseppe Alessi (29 October 1905 – 13 July 2009) was an Italian politician.

Biography

Alessi was born in San Cataldo, Caltanissetta, Sicily. He was one of the founding members of the Christian Democratic (Democrazia Cristiana) party on the island and became the first elected President of the Regional Government of Sicily. He was a member of the reform wing of the DC. From 1968-72, he was a member of the Italian Chamber of Deputies.

Journalist Alexander Stille interviewed Alessi in the 1990s and asked him about the relations between the Christian Democrats and the Mafia: "It happened this way. Some people in the Christian Democratic Party approached the separatists, whose backbone were these Mafia bosses and invited them to join the national parties ... [T]he Mafiosi were looking for the road to power, to secure the support they needed for their economic affairs. If the mayor was Republican, they became Republican, if he was Socialist, they were Socialist, if he was Christian Democrat they became Christian Democrat." Alessi defended them as a necessary evil of the Cold War period: "The Christian Democrats subordinated their ideals for a supreme interest of national importance: saving the democratic state. The victory of Communism would have meant Italy ended up behind the Iron Curtain."

Political views 
Alessi's justification of his party's dealings with the Mafia is based on a romantic view of the Mafia of the 1940s and 1950s: "They weren't criminals, they were local potentates, neighbourhood bosses, proud men of prestige. Their crimes were basically economic - fraud, forgery, illegal appropriation of property - but they disliked real crime."

Death
Alessi died in Palermo, aged 103, on 13 July 2009.

Honour 
 : Knight Grand Cross of the Order of Merit of the Italian Republic (10 may 1974)

References

External links
 "Giuseppe Alessi. Il primo presidente", Articolo da “Il venerdì” di La Repubblica, 22 June 2007 
 Announcement of Giuseppe Alessi's 103rd birthday (in Italian) 
 Obituary (in Italian) 

1905 births
2009 deaths
People from San Cataldo, Sicily
Italian People's Party (1919) politicians
Christian Democracy (Italy) politicians
Senators of Legislature IV of Italy
Deputies of Legislature V of Italy
Presidents of Sicily
Presidents of the Sicilian Regional Assembly
Italian centenarians
Knights Grand Cross of the Order of Merit of the Italian Republic
Knights Commander of the Order of Merit of the Federal Republic of Germany
Men centenarians
Politicians from the Province of Caltanissetta